Taghmon is a townland in County Westmeath, Ireland.

Taghmon is one of 11 townlands of the civil parish of Taghmon in the barony of Corkaree in the Province of Leinster.

The neighbouring townlands are: Gartlandstown to the north, Tuitestown to the north, Clondalever (Kilpatrick) to the north, Clondalever (Taghmon)  to the east, Balreagh to the south-east, Rathcorbally to the south, Foxburrow to the south, Glebe to the south, Monkstown to the south, Farrancallin to the south and Martinstown to the west.

In the 1911 census of Ireland there were 22 houses and 76 inhabitants in the townland.

References

External links
Map of Taghmon at openstreetmap.org
Taghmon at the IreAtlas Townland Data Base
Taghmon at Townlands.ie
Taghmon at The Placenames Database of Ireland

Townlands of County Westmeath